Jacob Bergström (born 26 April 1995) is a Swedish footballer who plays for Djurgårdens IF.

He played youth football for Karlskrona. In 2013 he was drafted into the senior squad. In 2019 he signed for Norwegian club Mjøndalen. In 2020 Bergstrom went back to Mjällby after they promoted to Allsvenskan.

Career statistics

Club

References

1995 births
Living people
Swedish footballers
Association football defenders
Superettan players
FK Karlskrona players
Mjällby AIF players
Mjøndalen IF players
Eliteserien players
Swedish expatriate footballers
Expatriate footballers in Norway
Swedish expatriate sportspeople in Norway